Grand Mere State Park is a public recreation and nature preservation area in the southwestern part of the U.S. state of Michigan near Stevensville. The state park is located adjacent to Interstate 94. Protected from Lake Michigan by the dunes to the west, the park has many natural features not found throughout the rest of the state. In 1968 it was designated a National Natural Landmark.

Geography
The  park is mostly wooded and has three geologically ancient inland lakes, left behind as the glaciers receded during the last ice age. At one time there were five such lakes, but two of the lakes have disappeared as a result of aquatic succession, and the remaining three can be seen to be slowly disappearing today.

The dunes protecting the park also create a relatively cool environment that supports plants not normally seen in southern Michigan, some of which are classified as rare, threatened or endangered.

Activities and amenities
The park offers swimming, hiking, picnicking, boat launch, and cross-country skiing.

The park has almost two miles of sandy beach, which can be reached only on foot by climbing over steep sand dunes. There are many trails for hiking and cross-country skiing, but most are neither posted nor maintained. (Biking on the trails is prohibited.) The trail conditions vary from loose sand to hard packed dirt. There are many hills including a large sand dune that was once used for off-road vehicles. Access to the dune by large, four-wheeled vehicles has been blocked with guard rails.

References

External links

Grand Mere State Park Michigan Michigan Department of Natural Resources
Grand Mere State Park Map Michigan Department of Natural Resources

State parks of Michigan
Protected areas of Berrien County, Michigan
Beaches of Michigan
Landforms of Berrien County, Michigan
National Natural Landmarks in Michigan
Protected areas established in 1973
1973 establishments in Michigan
IUCN Category III